Ransford Dodsworth Bucknam (June 7, 1869 – May 27, 1915) was a Nova Scotian who became a Pasha, an admiral in the Turkish navy and vice-admiral to the Turkish empire.   Bucknarn was decorated with the Star of the Order of Osmanieh, the distinguished Service Medal and other medals.

Biography
Bucknam was born in Halls Harbour, Nova Scotia on June 7, 1869 to Isabella Roscoe and Ezra Taylor Bucknam.

He lived there until his parents both died when he was eight.  He then moved with his paternal grandparents to Eatonville, Nova Scotia.  He moved to the United States and married Rose Thayer on January 2, 1904 in Philadelphia, Pennsylvania.

He joined the Turkish Navy in 1905. He retired from Turkish service when he was asked to renounce his United States citizenship in 1911.

He then became involved in the oil business.

He died in Istanbul on May 27, 1915 after several weeks of severe illness by a heart failure.

Memberships
He was a member of the following organizations: 
Pen & Pencil Club
Lotus Club
International Club at Panama
Boston Marine Society
Constantinople Club in Constantinople

Legacy 
He is the namesake of Bucknam Park, Halls Harbour, Nova Scotia

References

Further reading
(Note: This reference has incorrect years of his birth and death)

Military history of Nova Scotia
1869 births
1915 deaths
Canadian emigrants to the United States
American emigrants to the Ottoman Empire